Rimantas Dūda (July 26, 1953–January 18, 2017) was a Lithuanian painter and bookbinder. He was a part of the Vilniaus Dailės kombinato, Soviet-era art factories, from 1977-1997 producing paintings. He is known for creating unique leather goods including boxes and decorated books, now on display at the Lithuanian National Museum of Art.

See also
List of Lithuanian painters

References

Lithuanian painters
Artists from Vilnius
1953 births
2017 deaths